The Stonemason may refer to:

The Stonemason, play by Cormac McCarthy
The Stonemason (book) by Andrew Ziminski
The Stonemason Ostracon